Club Atlético San Lorenzo de Almagro is the men's professional club basketball section of the homonymous sports club based in Buenos Aires, Argentina. The team plays in the Liga Nacional de Básquet (LNB), which is the first tier level division of the Argentine basketball league system, and Pan-America's premier men's basketball league, the Basketball Champions League Americas. Their home arena is the Estadio Ciudad de Santiago del Estero. The team is currently coached by Silvio Santander. 
In the period 1942-1973, he stood out for what he did at the amateur and semi-amateur level, in which he won 29 regional titles, won the Argentine Club Championship, and was South American runner-up in 1958. In addition, he was one of the founding clubs of the National League, playing the opening game of said tournament on April 26, 1985. Although the club is known mainly for its soccer part, it is also one of the most important basketball clubs in the country and South America, being a multi-champion at various times in its history. He has to his credit five Leagues (2015-16, 2016-17, 2017-18, 2018-19 and 2020-21), two Liga de las Américas, and other titles such as a Super 4, and two Super Cups. San Lorenzo is the first, and so far, the only Argentine basketball team to face an NBA team. It is the only club that has been four-time and five-time champion of the National League.

History

Beginning and golden years 

San Lorenzo affiliated to the Argentine Association in the 1930s decade, and won a large number of championships from the 1930s to the 1970s, being nicknamed The Cathedral of Basketball. 1942 was the year when San Lorenzo achieved its first titles, winning the Torneo Apertura (Opening Tournament) and the Official championship, organised by the Buenos Aires Basketball Association. One year later, the team won another Apertura title, and they then won the 1946, 1949, and 1950 Apertura official titles. The club's most notable players of that era were Alfredo Belli, Salvador Capece, and Alberto Trama. Other notable members of the team were Armando Bo and Francisco Sommariva.

In 1951, San Lorenzo played against The Harlem Globetrotters, at the Estadio Luna Park, in Buenos Aires. That same year, the team won the Apertura championship (and repeated again in 1952), and the Official in 1954. Two years later, the team won another Official title, remaining unbeaten, and its first Torneo Metropolitano (Metropolitan Tournament) title. In 1957, San Lorenzo made its first international tour of Brazil, where the squad won 8 of 12 games played. Players on the tour were: Ricardo Lanzillotta (team captain), Herberto Fagnani, Edgar Parizzia, Oscar Zagatti, Carlos Vasino, Vicente Lazzara, Erio Cassetai, and Carlos Marranzino, with Francisco del Río being the head coach of the team.

San Lorenzo won its first national title in 1958, the Campeonato Argentino (Argentine Championship of Clubs). That allowed the team to play its first official tournament outside of Argentina, as the club competed in the South American top-tier level South American Championship of Champions Clubs, where San Lorenzo finished second, behind Defensor Sporting. At the Argentine national domestic level, San Lorenzo won the 1958 Apertura title, and finished third in the Buenos Aires championship (although the squad won the 1959 and 1960 titles). In 1966, San Lorenzo won the Apertura title finishing unbeaten, and both the Metropolitano and Buenos Aires championships, in 1968.

The 1970s began with the 1970 Metropolitano championship, and the club then winning two titles else in 1971. That same year, San Lorenzo toured in Europe, marking the first time that an Argentine team played there. The club's layers were Oscar Visciglia, Gustavo Aguirre, Carlos Perroni, Carlos Garro, Dante Massolini, Norberto Pacheco, Carlos Perales, Abel Rojas, Néstor Delgui, and Emilio Dumani, with Edgard Parizzia acting as the team's head coach. San Lorenzo defeated OKK Beograd, Yugoslavian national league club, and six rivals from Italy. They also played against the Spain national team. During that tour, the team was nicknamed, La Catedral (The cathedral), after a speech from team player Emilio Dumani, saying: "This is a team that always fights, and never turns off... like the lights of a Cathedral".

Despite those successful years, the 1973 Buenos Aires championship was their last title until the 2010s.

Liga Nacional and decline 

On April 26, 1985, San Lorenzo played the opening game of the recently created Liga Nacional de Básquet (LNB) (National Basketball League), facing Argentino de Firmat at the Obras Sanitarias venue. Nevertheless, the team was relegated that same year.

The basketball section of the club was inactive between 1986 and 1993, returning only at youth levels. In 1996, San Lorenzo's senior squad returned to first division tournaments of the city of Buenos Aires. The club also won the Under-22 championship (2004), and the 2012 Copa De Oyarbide (Oyarbide Cup).

Return to glory 

In 2014, San Lorenzo debuted in the Torneo Nacional de Ascenso (TNA) (National Promotion Tournament), the second tier level division of professional basketball in Argentina. In 2015, San Lorenzo acquired a vacant place in the Argentine top-tier level Liga Nacional de Básquet (LNB) (National Basketball League), because of a merger with the club 9 de Julio de Río Tercero. 30 years after its debut in the LNB, San Lorenzo returned to the top division on September 22, 2015, and beat Quimsa, by a score of 79–64.

San Lorenzo won its first LNB title in 2016, after beating La Unión, with a 4–0 series sweep in the league's finals. San Lorenzo player, Walter Herrmann, was chosen as MVP of the Finals.

In the following season, San Lorenzo won its 2nd consecutive Argentine League title, after defeating Regatas Corrientes, 4–1 at the finals. The team became the most winning team in the LNB's history, with a 23–3 record. Gabriel Deck was chosen as the Final's MVP. Unlike the 2015–16 series, San Lorenzo played its home games at Roberto Pando arena, in Boedo, Buenos Aires.

Arena
San Lorenzo plays its home games at the Polideportivo Roberto Pando, which is located in Boedo, Buenos Aires. The arena has a seating capacity of 2,700 people.

Players

Current roster

Notable players 

 Román González
 Walter Herrmann
 Nicolás Aguirre
 Marcos Mata
 Gabriel Deck
 Selem Safar
 Matías Sandes
 Máximo Fjellerup
 Mathías Calfani
 Javier Justiz Ferrer
 Guillermo Díaz
 DeJuan Blair
 Jerome Meyinsse
 Donald Sims   
 Joel Anthony
 Matthew Bryan-Amaning
 Juan Domingo de la Cruz
 Gani Lawal  
 Dar Tucker

Head coaches 
 Oscar Rigiroli
 Elpidio Pertuzzo
 José Biggi 
 Francisco Del Rio 
 Alberto Trama
 José Bellino
 Edgar Parizzia
 Julio Lamas
 Gonzalo García

Statistics

Games versus NBA and European-wide league teams

Versus NBA teams

Versus EuroLeague teams (Tier 1)

Versus FIBA Saporta Cup teams (Tier 2)

Versus FIBA Champions League teams (Tier 2)

Honours

National 
 Campeonato Argentino de Clubes (1): 1958
 Liga Nacional de Básquet (5): 2015–16, 2016–17, 2017–18, 2018–19, 2020-21

 Torneo Súper 4 (1): 2016–17

Regional 
 Asociación de Buenos Aires Championship (12): 1942, 1946, 1949, 1950, 1954, 1956, 1957, 1959, 1960, 1968, 1971, 1973
 Torneo Metropolitano (5): 1956, 1967, 1968, 1979, 1971

International 
 Liga de las Américas (2): 2018, 2019

Others 
 Arganda del Rey, Spain Invitational Game: 2017

In international competitions

Latin America
 Champions   Runners-up   Third place   Fourth place

FIBA Intercontinental Cup

 Champions   Runners-up   Third place   Fourth place

See also 
 San Lorenzo de Almagro

References

External links

  
 San Lorenzo Basquet at LNB 
 San Lorenzo Basquet at Latinbasket

1935 establishments in Argentina
S
S